San Antonino Monte Verde is a town and municipality in Oaxaca in south-western Mexico. The municipality covers an area of 178.62 km². 
It is part of the Teposcolula District in the center of the Mixteca Region.

As of 2005, the municipality had a total population of 6482.

References

Municipalities of Oaxaca